Prince Leopold Franz Julius of Saxe-Coburg and Gotha (31 January 1824 – 20 May 1884) was a German prince of the House of Saxe-Coburg and Gotha-Koháry.

Born Prince Leopold Franz Julius of Saxe-Coburg-Saalfeld, Duke in Saxony, he was the third son of Ferdinand, Prince of Saxe-Coburg and Gotha-Koháry and Princess Maria Antonia Koháry de Csábrág et Szitnya.

Leopold was a younger son and was unlikely to inherit titles or land, so he entered the Army in the service of the Austrian Empire. At one point Leopold was considered as a potential husband for Isabel II of Spain. This did not, however, prove to be realistic, given the resistance of France and other European powers. Spain had been the scene of Great Power rivalry throughout the period since 1815 and all the Great Powers were seeking to exert their influence by supporting different candidates. The Saxe-Coburg family was perceived to be too closely linked with British interests. The Coburg influence extended widely. In Great Britain, Queen Victoria and her husband Prince Albert were Leopold's first cousins, while Leopold I of Belgium was Leopold's paternal and Victoria's maternal uncle, and Leopold's brother was King Ferdinand II of Portugal, husband of Queen Maria II of Portugal.  Leopold's candidature in the affair of the Spanish Marriages was used by France as the excuse to negotiate the hasty marriage between Queen Isabella II of Spain and her cousin Francis of Spain, at the same time as that between the son of Louis Philippe and the Queen of Spain's younger sister.

Later, Leopold met Constanze Geiger, a common woman. They had son, named Franz, in Vienna on 12 October 1860. Leopold and Constanze married six months later, on 23 April 1861. Immediately, he recognized his son, who was created Freiherr von Ruttenstein on 24 July 1862. The same day, Constanze was created Freifrau von Ruttenstein in her own right. Because the marriage of his parents was unequal (and thus morganatic), Franz was barred from the succession of Koháry and Saxe-Coburg-Gotha. Regardless, he died childless and unmarried on 29 August 1899.

Honours 
 : Grand Cordon of the Order of Leopold (military), 3 May 1850
    Ernestine duchies: Grand Cross of the Saxe-Ernestine House Order, March 1842
 : Grand Cross of the Order of the Tower and Sword, 19 June 1843

References

E. Jones-Parry, The Spanish Marriages, 1841-1846 (London, 1936)

1824 births
1884 deaths
Princes of Saxe-Coburg and Gotha
House of Saxe-Coburg-Gotha-Koháry
Nobility from Vienna
Burials at the Ducal Family Mausoleum, Glockenburg Cemetery, Coburg